Terrimicrobium is a Gram-negative, mesophilic, non-spore-forming, strictly anaerobic and non-motile genus of bacteria from the family of Terrimicrobiaceae with one known species (Terrimicrobium sacchariphilum). Terrimicrobium sacchariphilum has been isolated from a rice paddy field.

References

 

Verrucomicrobiota
Monotypic bacteria genera
Bacteria genera
Taxa described in 2014